Thomas or Tom Sexton may refer to:

 Tom Sexton (cyclist) (born 1998), New Zealand cyclist
 Thomas Sexton (Irish politician) (1848–1932), Irish journalist, financial expert, nationalist politician and Member of Parliament
 Thomas Sexton (English politician) (1879–1946), Labour Party politician in England, MP 1935–1945
 Tom Sexton (poet) (born 1940), Alaskan poet and scholar
 Tom Sexton (baseball) (1865–1934), American Major League Baseball player
 Tom Sexton (rugby union) (born 1989), rugby union player